Dover Beaches South, more commonly known as Ortley Beach, is an unincorporated community and census-designated place (CDP) located within Toms River, in Ocean County, New Jersey, United States. As of the 2010 United States Census, the CDP's population was 1,209. Dover Beaches South is situated on the Barnegat Peninsula, a long, narrow barrier peninsula that separates Barnegat Bay from the Atlantic Ocean.

Toms River Township is split by the United States Census Bureau into three CDPs; Toms River CDP on the mainland, comprising over 95% of the township's population, along with the Jersey Shore communities of Dover Beaches North and Dover Beaches South.

Geography
According to the United States Census Bureau, the CDP had a total area of 1.030 square miles (2.665 km2), including 0.620 square miles (1.605 km2) of land and 0.410 square miles (1.061 km2) of water (39.80%). The CDP is bordered by the municipalities of Lavallette and Seaside Heights.

Demographics

2010 census

2000 census
As of the 2000 United States Census there were 1,594 people, 862 households, and 422 families residing in the CDP. The population density was 992.7/km2 (2,568.6/mi2). There were 2,622 housing units at an average density of 1,632.8/km2 (4,225.1/mi2). The racial makeup of the CDP was 92.93% White, 0.46% African American, 0.31% Native American, 0.25% Asian, 0.06% from other races, and 1.38% from two or more races. Hispanic or Latino of any race were 4.13% of the population.

There were 862 households, out of which 13.2% had children under the age of 18 living with them, 38.2% were married couples living together, 8.7% had a female householder with no husband present, and 51.0% were non-families. 46.4% of all households were made up of individuals, and 18.6% had someone living alone who was 65 years of age or older. The average household size was 1.85 and the average family size was 2.59.

In the CDP the population was spread out, with 12.6% under the age of 18, 4.2% from 18 to 24, 26.2% from 25 to 44, 31.2% from 45 to 64, and 25.7% who were 65 years of age or older. The median age was 49 years. For every 100 females, there were 94.6 males. For every 100 females age 18 and over, there were 91.6 males.

The median income for a household in the CDP was $38,407, and the median income for a family was $53,811. Males had a median income of $38,984 versus $35,735 for females. The per capita income for the CDP was $26,702. About 5.5% of families and 10.0% of the population were below the poverty line, including 25.9% of those under age 18 and 6.0% of those age 65 or over.

History

The current location of Ortley Beach was once home to Cranberry Inlet, an important maritime route that closed after an 1812 storm. The area was opened to development by the completion of the Pennsylvania Railroad on the peninsula in 1883 and the completion of what is now Route 35 in 1913. The community was settled as a vacation resort in the 1940s and 1950s. There were several unsuccessful efforts to secede from Dover Township in the latter half of the 20th century. After suffering widespread damage to its housing stock during Hurricane Sandy, some publications have argued that Ortley Beach is undergoing gentrification as high rebuilding costs have pushed out older residents and ushered in a new wave of luxury homes.

Climate

According to the Köppen climate classification system, Dover Beaches South, New Jersey has a humid subtropical climate (Cfa) with hot, slightly humid summers, cool winters and year-around precipitation. Cfa climates are characterized by all months having an average mean temperature > 32.0 °F (> 0.0 °C), at least four months with an average mean temperature ≥ 50.0 °F (≥ 10.0 °C), at least one month with an average mean temperature ≥ 71.6 °F (≥ 22.0 °C) and no significant precipitation difference between seasons. During the summer months in Dover Beaches South, a cooling afternoon sea breeze is present on most days, but episodes of extreme heat and humidity can occur with heat index values ≥ 95 °F (≥ 35 °C). On average, the wettest month of the year is July which corresponds with the annual peak in thunderstorm activity. During the winter months, episodes of extreme cold and wind can occur with wind chill values < 0 °F (< -18 °C). The plant hardiness zone at Dover Beaches South Beach is 7a with an average annual extreme minimum air temperature of 3.8 °F (-15.7 °C). The average seasonal (Nov-Apr) snowfall total is between 18 and 24 inches (46 and 61 cm), and the average snowiest month is February which corresponds with the annual peak in nor'easter activity.

Ecology

According to the A. W. Kuchler U.S. potential natural vegetation types, Dover Beaches South, New Jersey would have a dominant vegetation type of Northern Cordgrass (73) with a dominant vegetation form of Coastal Prairie (20).

References

External links

Ortley Beach Visitor Information

Census-designated places in Ocean County, New Jersey
Jersey Shore communities in Ocean County
Toms River, New Jersey